Marcel Brands (born 1962) is a Dutch former professional footballer who is currently the Director of Football at PSV Eindhoven.

Playing career 
Born in 's-Hertogenbosch, Brands started his playing career at local club FC Den Bosch. He also played for NAC Breda and Feyenoord, and made over 350 appearances for RKC Waalwijk, encompassing two separate spells.

Non-playing career 
After retiring he became technical director at RKC Waalwijk and appointed Martin Jol as club manager. In 2005 he moved to join AZ, along with manager Louis van Gaal, and in 2008-09 the club went on to win only their second ever Eredivisie title. Brands moved to PSV in 2010 to improve the club's transfer strategy and youth development. He would spend eight years with the club, in which time they won three Eredivisie titles, three Johan Cruyff Shields and one KNVB Cup. In May 2018 he joined English club Everton, replacing Steve Walsh as their director of Football. On 5 December 2021, Brands left the club with immediate effect.

References 

1962 births
Living people
RKC Waalwijk players
Feyenoord players
FC Den Bosch players
NAC Breda players
Association football midfielders
Dutch footballers
Sportspeople from 's-Hertogenbosch
Footballers from North Brabant
RKC Waalwijk non-playing staff
AZ Alkmaar non-playing staff
PSV Eindhoven non-playing staff
Everton F.C. directors and chairmen
Directors of football clubs in the Netherlands